The Faculty of Homeopathy was formed in 1944 from the British Homeopathic Society (founded in 1844).  It was incorporated by the Faculty of Homeopathy Act 1950, which confers an educational function on the Faculty. The Faculty promotes the development of homeopathy.

Homeopathy is a form of alternative medicine which is generally considered ineffective and a form of pseudoscience. Prince Charles became a patron of the organisation in 2019.

Membership
The Faculty claims "over 500 members worldwide".  Membership is open to statutorily registered healthcare professionals, with student membership available to undergraduates on medical courses.

Training
Faculty-Accredited courses in homeopathy are taught at four locations in the UK and at four overseas. After specified training periods, students are eligible to sit the specialist examinations, which lead to the Faculty's qualifications: LFHom, MFHom (for dentists, doctors, nurses, pharmacists and podiatrists), VetMFHom (for veterinary surgeons) and DFHom (for pharmacists and podiatrists).  The qualifications do not themselves confer any legal qualification to practise homeopathy.

Publications
The Faculty publishes Homeopathy (formerly the British Homoeopathic Journal -BHJ). This journal was first published in 1844, as the British Journal of Homoeopathy (BJH), which became the BHJ in 1911.

Simile is a regular newsletter for members.

Notes

External links
The Faculty of Homeopathy
The British Homeopathic Dental Association (Advocacy site)

Homeopathy
Homeopathic organizations